Manslaughter is a 1922 American silent drama film directed by Cecil B. DeMille and starring Thomas Meighan, Leatrice Joy, and Lois Wilson. It was scripted by Jeanie MacPherson adapted from the novel of the same name by Alice Duer Miller. The film portrays the main character, Lydia Thorne, as a thrill-seeking, self-entitled, and wild woman who does not have a reputation of thinking before acting. She acts selfishly by dancing with other men in the presence of her husband and not providing help to her maid who is in dire need for her son's health. As a result of her numerous poor decisions, she is taken to court because of a vehicle accident entailing a high-speed chase she has with a motorcyclist policeman. Following this accident, she is imprisoned for manslaughter after being prosecuted by her husband, Daniel O'Bannon, who is a lawyer. After this endeavor, Lydia comes out of jail to find her husband has become an alcoholic.

This film was one of the first to depict very graphic scene of men plundering a room of women meant to represent the descent of Lydia's privileged life., and this film contained various imagery depicting life among the upper-class society. Manslaughter was the first film to show an erotic kiss between two members of the same sex. The film consists of a character development that added to the film's success, and at the time romance was a popular hit of the time because of the demographic that the films were addressing.

Plot
A wild, wealthy woman (Joy) is brought to heel by a sermonizing district attorney after she accidentally hits and kills a motorcycle cop.

Cast

 Leatrice Joy as Lydia Thorne
 Thomas Meighan as Daniel J. O'Bannon
 Lois Wilson as Evans (Lydia's maid)
 John Miltern as Gov. Stephan Albee
 George Fawcett as Judge Homans
 Julia Faye as Mrs. Drummond
 Edythe Chapman as Adeline Bennett
 Jack Mower as Drummond (policeman)
 Dorothy Cumming as Eleanor Bellington
 Casson Ferguson as Bobby Dorest
 Michael D. Moore as Dicky Evans (as Mickey Moore)
 James Neill as Butler
 Sylvia Ashton as Prison matron
 Raymond Hatton as Brown
 Mabel Van Buren as Prisoner
 Ethel Wales as Prisoner
 Dale Fuller as Prisoner
 Edward Martindel as Wiley
 Charles Ogle as Doctor
 Guy Oliver as Musician
 Shannon Day as Miss Santa Claus
 Lucien Littlefield as Witness

Production

The production of this film was completed during a time when films were taking on tremendous set processes and crews. Film shooting processing was becoming more complex, involving actors and actresses, producers, set developers, screenwriters, camera-crew and lighting, and numerously more parts. It was a film created using continuity filming which involves continuing a screen from different points of view.

According to Leatrice Joy, the filming of the car chase scene was extremely nerve-wracking because she herself had to drive the car, which had been fitted with a platform to support two cameramen and the director, plus equipment. Their safety depended entirely upon her skills as a motorist. Joy did most of her own driving, though in some shots the car was driven by stunt double Leo Nomis. During the shooting of a prison sequence, Joy burned her hand accidentally with soup in a prop cauldron; assistant director Cullen Tate had neglected to inform her that the soup was scalding hot.

Stuntman Leo Noomis broke his pelvis and six of his ribs during a stunt that required him to crash a motorcycle into a car.

Reaction
Manslaughter is thought of by historians as one of De Mille's lesser efforts as a director. Historian Kevin Brownlow notes that Joy and Wilson "both give far better performances than the film deserves." "It is hard to believe that such a crude and unsubtle film could come from a veteran like De Mille," said a 1963 Theodore Huff Society program note for the film, "harder still to believe that this came from the same year that Orphans of the Storm, Down to the Sea in Ships, and Foolish Wives. The amateurish and crudely faked chase scenes that start the film are of less technical slickness than Sennett had been getting ten years earlier. Manslaughter is exactly the kind of picture that the unknowing regard as typical of the silent film - overwrought, pantomimically acted, written in the manner of a Victorian melodrama, the kind of film that invites laughter at it rather than with it."

When a print was screened by William K. Everson for Joy's daughter's birthday, the star of the film attended and saw it for the first time in forty years. According to Kevin Brownlow, "Miss Joy thought it hilarious."

Preservation status
Prints of the film exist in the George Eastman House film archive and the Paul Killiam Collection.

References

External links

Manslaughter at Virtual History

1922 films
1922 drama films
1920s LGBT-related films
American black-and-white films
Silent American drama films
American LGBT-related films
American silent feature films
Films based on American novels
Films directed by Cecil B. DeMille
Films based on works by Alice Duer Miller
Paramount Pictures films
1920s American films